Vladimir Čonč (13 January 1928 – 15 October 2012) was a Croatian footballer.

Club career
He played for several clubs from Zagreb, including Građanski, NK Poštar and Lokomotiva, but is best remembered for his eight-year spell with Dinamo Zagreb where he played from 1953 to 1961. He appeared in a total of 413 games and scored 119 goals for the Blues (including 173 appearances and 43 goals in the Yugoslav First League). After leaving Dinamo in 1961 he spent several seasons with German lower level sides Kickers Offenbach, Eintracht Bad Kreuznach and Opel Rüsselsheim before retiring in 1966.

International career
Čonč was also member of the Yugoslavia squad which won silver medal at the 1952 Summer Olympics, and was capped once for Yugoslavia in a friendly against England held at Wembley on 28 November 1956.

Honours
Yugoslav First League (2): 1953–54, 1957–58
Yugoslav Cup (1): 1960

References

External links

1928 births
2012 deaths
Footballers from Zagreb
Association football midfielders
Yugoslav footballers
Yugoslavia international footballers
Footballers at the 1952 Summer Olympics
Olympic footballers of Yugoslavia
Olympic silver medalists for Yugoslavia
Olympic medalists in football
Medalists at the 1952 Summer Olympics
NK Lokomotiva Zagreb players
FK Naša Krila Zemun players
GNK Dinamo Zagreb players
Kickers Offenbach players
Eintracht Bad Kreuznach players
SC Opel Rüsselsheim players
Yugoslav First League players
Oberliga (football) players
Yugoslav expatriate footballers
Expatriate footballers in West Germany
Yugoslav expatriate sportspeople in West Germany